The following is a detailed and ordered list of films belonging to "The Black List" and that have already been produced and released in theaters or via streaming.

2006

2007

References

External links
 

Black List
Black List